was formed in 2012 by the merger of the old Nippon Steel and Sumitomo Metal.  was established in 1970 by the merger of Fuji Iron & Steel and Yawata Iron & Steel. Nippon Steel is the world's third largest steel producer by volume as of 2019.

History

Early years 
Nippon Steel was created by the merger of two giants, Yawata Iron & Steel (八幡製鉄 Yawata Seitetsu) and Fuji Iron & Steel (富士製鉄 Fuji Seitetsu). Beginning in early 1981, however, the company cut production and saw a sharp decline in profit that fiscal year. Forced to close furnaces, the company exhibited a typical Japanese economic aversion to layoffs, opting instead to offer standard early retirement enticements but also less conventional schemes such as a mushroom cultivation venture that used the surplus heat created by steel furnaces to temperature control a fecund fungi complex.

Troubled times 
Attributing the drop to higher material costs, the company entered into another troubled year. In 1983, the company reported the end of the fiscal year (March 31) would reveal Nippon Steel was in an even more beleaguered situation. A fall in demand brought about a 39 percent tumble in profits from an already weak previous year.  During this time the entire Japanese steel industry struggled in a period of turmoil as other nations such as South Korea, with only a fraction of labor costs, won over business. The company announced a loss in 1986, prompting a determined effort to diversify away from the moribund "smokestack" industrial sector and to provide new work for thousands of employees that would be transferred from closing furnaces.

Diversification 
Nippon Steel expanded or further established itself in semiconductors, electronics, a theme park called Space World, software, and even human resources products. Most notable was Librex Computer Systems, Nippon Steel's attempt to sell notebook computers abroad that lasted from 1990 to 1993. The company bucked seven struggling but profitable years when it returned to loss in 1993. Again, thousands of employees would be transferred to new operations. Due to cost-cutting, the company returned to health in 1995.  However, Nippon Steel reported earnings in 1999 suffered from an overwhelming charge needed to cover pension costs, a problem not uncommon for shrinking industrial giants. 2002 and 2003 would be back-to-back loss years, but robust demand for steel in the People's Republic of China returned the company to profitability. (However, Nippon Steel had an operating profit for 2002 and 2003. The losses were made of extraordinary losses because of reevaluation of real estate and securities of the company among others.) Following a triple merger of Sumitomo Corporation, Kinzoku Steel Corporation (Sumikin Bussan), and the existing Nippon Steel, NSSC was formed as these companies' conglomerate Stainless Steel division.

Merger 
In early 2011, Nippon Steel announced plans to merge with Sumitomo Metal Industries. With Nippon Steel producing ~26.5 million tonnes of steel per year and Sumitomo making ~11 million tonnes, the merged entity would produce close to 37 million tonnes of crude steel per year. This volume of steel output would make Nippon Steel the second largest steelmaker in the world, putting it well ahead of Baosteel – the current number two (making ~31 mt steel / year) – although still well behind ArcelorMittal (who produced 77.5 mt crude steel in 2010).

On October 1, 2012, Nippon Steel formally merged with Sumitomo Metal Industries at a ratio of 0.735 Nippon Steel shares per Sumitomo Metal share. The merged stock is listed (under number 5401, the old Nippon Steel number) as Nippon Steel & Sumitomo Metal Corp. The logistics branches of both companies are announced to be merged on April 1, 2013, under the name "Nippon Steel & Sumikin Logistics Co., Ltd.", wholly owned by Nippon Steel & Sumitomo Metal Corporation. The merged company planned to publish a common fact book in the summer of 2013.

On April 1, 2019, the Japanese name of the company was changed from Nippon Steel & Sumitomo Metal Corporation to Nippon Steel Corporation.

Present 
By May 2020, Nippon Steel has announced that it would suspend operations of four furnaces, of which one for permanently, as it booked an annual loss in FY 2019.

Major plant locations 

Muroran, Hokkaido
Kamaishi, Iwate
Kimitsu, Chiba: Kimitsu Steel Works
Tokyo
Tōkai, Aichi (Nagoya)
Sakai, Osaka
Himeji, Hyogo (Hirohata)
Hikari, Yamaguchi – steel piping
Kitakyushu, Fukuoka (Yahata)
Oita, Oita

Added after Sumitomo merger 
Kashima, Ibaraki
Jōetsu, Niigata (Naoetsu)
Amagasaki, Hyōgo
Osaka
Wakayama
Kitakyushu, Fukuoka (Kokura)

Joint ventures 
New Carlisle, Indiana, USA (built 1991)
AM/NS Calvert. Formerly named ThyssenKrupp Steel USA and located in Calvert, Alabama, the facility was purchased from ThyssenKrupp through a 50/50 joint partnership with ArcelorMittal in February 2014 for $1.5 billion and renamed AM/NS Calvert. A greenfield construction project which began in 2007, the facility began operation in 2010 and has a production capacity of 5.3 million tons and includes a hot strip mill, cold roll mill and 4 coating lines. Products from the facility are marketed in the NAFTA region through managing partner ArcelorMittal.
Nippon Steel Trading Co., Ltd., has set up a joint venture with three Indonesian local companies to produce 120,000 tons of sheet steel for the automotive industry. Nippon Steel would control a 30 percent share of the joint venture, PT IndoJapan Steel Center. It is located in the Mitra Karawang Industrial Estate, West Java in a 4.8-hectare area with total investment for first phase $38 million and was expected to start operating in January 2013.
POSCO-Nippon Steel RHF Joint Venture, Co., Ltd., located in Pohang, South Korea. Using rotary hearth furnace technology, the company recycles sludge and dust coming out from the POSCO plants.
Nippon and POSCO reached an agreement with Teck Resources Limited (TSX: TECK.A and TECK.B, NYSE: TECK) to exchange minority interests into some Teck operations for a new interest into Elk Valley Resources Ltd (“EVR”) that was spin ned-off on Feb 21st, 2023.

Controversies 
 
On October 30, 2018, the South Korean Supreme Court rejected appeals to overturn a 2013 order requiring Nippon to pay compensation to four South Korean workers who underwent forced labor which occurred during World War II and ordered Nippon to pay each of the workers an individual sum of 100 million won (US$87,700). The four surviving steel workers, who were victims of forced labor which was supervised by Sumitomo, originally filed suit in 2005. A Nippon spokesman called the decision "deeply regretful," while also promising a review of the ruling. The Japanese Minister of Foreign Affairs Taro Kono maintained that the matter "has been resolved following the Treaty on Basic Relations between Japan and the Republic of Korea".

The asset seizure ordered by the Korean supreme court involves Nippon's stake in PNR, the POSCO-Nippon joint venture.

Environmental record 
In 2005 the Nippon Steel corporation made a plan to step up its capacity for recycling waste plastics into coke by 30%. Coke is a main resource in steel production. To manage the load they have invested ¥4 billion (about $38.2 million) to install equipment at Oita Mill and set up a second furnace at Kyushu facility.

In 2006 Nippon Steel and Mitsubishi Heavy Industries, Ltd. (MHI) jointly created a high tensile strength steel. The first application this steel was used for was the hulls of container ships. This steel allows the ships to be just as strong without the thick steel that it was requiring for them to grow in size. The smaller thickness allows the ships to attain a greater fuel-efficiency, cutting down on the environmental load of the ships.

Nippon Steel announced a pilot project to process waste food into ethanol in 2006. They have tasked Kitakyushu City with collecting and sorting the food waste and Nishihara Co., a waste management company, with developing new technologies to implement the sorted collecting system. To minimize costs they will use waste heat from an existing incineration facility that had not been effectively utilized, and the residue left after ethanol recovery will be burned in this incinerator.

Nippon Steel has been addressing environmental issues in an integrated manner as part of the overall management since the establishment of the company, aiming at realizing a sustainable society. In 2011, the company was awarded with the Fray International Sustainability Award in Mexico, for its approach in achieving Eco-processes, Eco-products, and Eco-solutions.

Carbon footprint
Nippon Steel reported Total CO2e emissions (Direct + Indirect) for the twelve months ending 31 March 2020 at 73,706 Kt (-16,556 /-18.3% y-o-y). Reported emissions have been on a downward trend since 2016.

See also 

History of Nippon Steel Corporation
 Anti-Japanese sentiment in Korea
 NS Solutions
 Kashima Antlers
 Nippon Steel Yawata S.C., former company football club, based near the Yawata plant and originally owned by it before the Fuji Steel merger

References 

Manufacturing companies based in Tokyo
Anti-Japanese sentiment in Korea
Chemical companies based in Tokyo
Steel companies of Japan
Defense companies of Japan
Japanese brands
Companies listed on the Tokyo Stock Exchange